The Roman Catholic Diocese of Poggio Mirteto, in central Italia region Lazio's Province of Rieti (formerly in the province of Perugia), was a Latin bishopric from 1841 until its merger in to the Suburbicarian see of Sabina in 1925.

History 
Poggio Mirteto was previously under the jurisdiction of the Territorial Abbey of Farfa, which later passed to the Diocese of Sabina.

The diocese of Poggio Mirteto was established on 1841.11.25, on territory split off from the Roman Catholic Diocese of Rieti, the Diocese of Sabina and the suppressed Territorial Abbacy of San Salvatore Maggiore, whose old collegiate church became the cathedral, and a diocesan seminary was established.

The diocese had in the early 20th century 38 parishes, with 32,600 inhabitants, 2 religious houses of men and 8 of sisters, under whose direction were the schools for girls in several communes.

On 1925.06.03 its title and some territory were united with (i.e. merged into) the Roman Catholic Diocese of Sabina to form the suburbicarian see of Sabina e Poggio Mirteto, other territory was returned to the other mother-bishopric, the Diocese of Rieti.

Episcopal ordinaries
The first bishop was Nicolo Crispigni. The last was Cardinal Gaetano de Lai.
Bishops of Poggio Mirteto
TO BE ELABORATED
 Angelo Rossi (1874.12.21 – 1882.01.24), later Bishop of Civitavecchia (Italy) (1882.01.24 – 1906.10.14), Bishop of Tarquinia (Italy) (1882.01.24 – death 1906.10.14)
 Luciano Saracani, Friars Minor (O.F.M.) (1882.03.27 – 1888.06.01), emeritate as Titular Bishop of Epiphania (1888.06.01 – death 1892.08.23)
 Paolo de Sanctis (1888.06.01 – 1896.06.22), emeritate as Titular Archbishop of Sardica (1896.06.22 – death 1907)
 Domenico Ambrosi (1896.06.22 – 1899.12.19), later Bishop of Terracina (Italy) (1899.12.19 – 1921.08.17), Bishop of Priverno (Italy) (1899.12.19 – 1921.08.17), Bishop of Sezze (Italy) (1899.12.19 – death 1921.08.17)
 Giuseppe Gandolfi (1899.12.14 – 1906.09.26), later Bishop of Jesi (Italy) (1906.09.26 – death 1927.09.14)
Archbishop-bishop Bartolomeo Mirra (1908.08.22 – death 1917.03.28), previously Titular Bishop of Amathus in Palæstina (1898.02.11 – 1907.04.15), Titular Archbishop of Auxume (1907.04.15 – 1908.08.22)
 Luigi Ferretti (1917.11.17 – 1924.03.24), later Bishop of Macerata (Italy) (1924.03.24 – 1934.11.26), Bishop of Tolentino (Italy) (1924.03.24 – 1934.11.26)Apostolic Administrator Gaetano De Lai (1924.08.07 – 1925.06.03), while Cardinal-Bishop of Sabina (from 1925 of Sabina e Poggio Mirteto) (1911.11.27 – 1928.10.24), Cardinal Vice-Dean of Sacred College of Cardinals (1919.03.23 – 1928.10.24), Superior General of Congregation of the Missionaries of Saint Charles Borromeo (Scalabrinians) (1924 – 1928.10.24)

Notes and references

Attribution

Sources and external links
GCatholic with incumbent bio links

Poggio Mirteto
Religious organizations established in 1841
1925 disestablishments in Italy
1841 establishments in Italy